Siskiyou Pass (sometimes called Siskiyou Summit) is a historic mountain pass in the Siskiyou Mountains of Jackson County. It is the most used pass in the U.S. state of Oregon. The Hudson's Bay Company (HBC) made the Siskiyou Trail over the pass before pioneers traversed it with their wagons, while still later it evolved into a stage road, a railroad line, and a highway route. The name Siskiyou is believed to be derived from Cree, meaning "bob-tailed horse". Siskiyou Pass is west of the summit (high point) of Interstate 5, which is known as Siskiyou Summit (though sometimes it is referred to as "Siskiyou Pass").

Geography
The pass is situated in Jackson County on the road and rail transport link between Oregon and California.

Pilot Rock is nearby, named for its use as a visual guide for traversing across the pass. Tunnel 13 on the Oregon and California Railroad line, which is now operated by the Central Oregon and Pacific Railroad, summits at Siskiyou Pass.

History
Its historic use as a pass is traced to European Americans who ventured into this region during the late 1820s. The first person noted with crossing this pass was Peter Skene Ogden, an HBC fur trader, who led his group of trappers traveling from south to north in February 1827. The hazards and extreme winter climate was experienced in 1829 when Alexander Roderick McLeod encountered a severe blizzard while traveling from Fort Vancouver via the Rogue Valley. It forced him to turn back from the pass. HBC started using the pass as a trail for wagons in the later part of the nineteenth century and then converted it into a stage road, and eventually to a railroad line. The pass was beset with security issues as local Indian tribes attacked the foreign agencies operating on the route including robbing rail cars. Between the 1890s through 1910s, the motivating force changed to locomotive driven snow plowers to push the ice packs and pave way for traffic to pass that could reduce the time of travel which otherwise used to take months in the initial years of travel. By the 1940s, a guardrail system was implemented along the highway, using short, white posts. It is the most used pass in the state.

Road
The descent along this highway is considered the most dangerous, particularly on foggy nights when visibility is almost next to nothing. In spite of the hazards involved, 13,000 trucks ply this route every day. To address emergency situations for drivers, escape ramps have been provided at Mileposts 6.3 and 9.5. An extensive warning system has been devised and put into effect to make truckers be aware of what they are likely to face on this pass. The precautionary measures including chaining truck tires along road shoulders, providing designated inspection sites, as well as avoiding travel during night and early morning hours in winter months. It is also recommended that drivers listen to updated weather information and road conditions on the radio before and during the entire journey through the pass.

Rail
The Oregon & California Railroad proposed an alternate route for the Oregon and California rail connection, which would have avoided Siskiyou Pass. However, Oregon politicians decided in favor of the present rail route. When Tunnel 13 was completed in 1887, beneath the Siskiyou Pass, there was finally a rail link between Oregon and California. In the 1920s, the Southern Pacific Railroad constructed the Natron Cutoff, a faster, cheaper route between the two states.

The rail route is currently owned by the Central Oregon and Pacific Railroad. By 2011, almost ten years had lapsed since trains crossed the pass.

The pass was reopened to rail traffic in 2015, linking Weed, CA and Eugene, OR

See also
List of mountain passes in Oregon

References

Mountain passes of Oregon
U.S. Route 99
Landforms of Jackson County, Oregon